Ruby Mountain may refer to the following mountains:

Ruby Mountain (Washington), Washington, United States
Ruby Mountain, British Columbia, Canada
Ruby Mountain (New York), New York, United States

See also
Ruby Mountains